Tanacetum camphoratum is a species of flowering plant in the aster family known by the common names camphor tansy and dune tansy. It is native to the Pacific Coast of North America from British Columbia to California, where it grows in sand dunes and other coastline habitat. This species may be known by the synonym Tanacetum douglasii and is often included in Tanacetum bipinnatum. It is a rhizomatous perennial herb with a thick, low-lying stem up to 25 centimeters long, branching to form a mass of vegetation. It is hairy, glandular, and aromatic, with a camphor scent. The leaves are up to 25 centimeters long and thick but featherlike, divided into many narrow leaflets on each side of the main rachis. Each leaflet in turn has many segments along each side, and the segments are usually divided into several small, knobby segments with folded or curled edges. The inflorescence bears up to 15 flower heads, each about a centimeter wide or slightly wider. Each head contains many yellowish disc florets and many pistillate florets around the edges. The latter may have minute ray florets. The fruit is an achene a few millimeters long which is tipped with a small pappus of toothed scales.

References

External links
Jepson Manual Treatment
Photo gallery

camphoratum